Levuglandins are reactive aldehydes formed by the spontaneous rearrangement of prostaglandin H (PGH). Enantiomerically pure levuglandin (LG) E2 can also be formed through the cyclooxygenase (COX) pathway by a rearrangement of the prostaglandin (PG) endoperoxide PGH 2. They are nonclassic eicosanoids. One species, levuglandin E2, (LGE2), forms neurotoxic adducts with 
amyloid beta.
Levuglandins and isolevuglandins can damage proteins by covalent adduction, thereby interfering with their normal functions. 
These lipid-derived protein modifications may serve as dosimeters of oxidative injury. 
Elevated plasma levels of isoLG-protein epitopes are associated with atherosclerosis but are independent of total cholesterol, a classical risk factor.

History
Though spontaneous rearrangements of PGH2 are known to generate prostaglandins (PG) PGD2 and PGE2. Prof. Robert Salomon at Case Western Reserve University  discovered that a novel alternative rearrangement also occurs that producing two γ-ketoaldehydes and named them levuglandins LGD2 and LGE2 as they are derivatives of levulinaldehyde with prostanoid side chains.

References

Eicosanoids